Spokane Shadow was an American soccer team, founded in 1996. The team competed in the National Premier Soccer League as well as the Evergreen Premier League, one of United States Adult Soccer Association's elite amateur leagues. From 1996 to 2005, the team played in the United Soccer Leagues Premier Development League (PDL), the fourth tier of the American Soccer Pyramid. The men's team folded when the franchise was terminated in 2006 by the PDL after the 10-year-old artificial turf at their home ground, Joe Albi Stadium in Spokane, Washington was declared unsafe for play.

Spokane's place in the Western Conference Northwest Division of the PDL was taken by Tacoma F.C. The team was revived as Spokane Shadow Club Shadow in 2014 as a member of the Evergreen Premier League (EPLWA) and play at Spokane Falls Community College. Beginning with the 2017 season, SSC Shadow also fielded a team in NPSL.

Year-by-year

Honors
 NPSL Northwest Conference Champions 2018
 EPLWA Champions 2014, 2015
 USL PDL Northwest Division Champions 2003
 USL PDL Western Conference Champions 1999
 USISL PDSL Northwest Division Champions 1997, 1998
 USISL Premier League Western-Northern Division Champions 1996

Coaches
  Einar Thorarinsson (1995–1996)
  Sean Bushey (1997–1999)
  Stuart Saunders (2004–2005)
  Chad Brown (2014–2016)
  Cameron Bushey (2017–2018)
  Mike Pellicio (2018–2021)
  Jay Vela (2022–present)

Stadia
 Joe Albi Stadium, Spokane, Washington 2003–05
 Spokane Falls Community College, Spokane, Washington 2014–present
Spokane Polo Club

See also
 Spokane Spiders

References

External links
 Spokane Shadow
 USL announces 2007 PDL Divisions

Sports in Spokane, Washington
Soccer clubs in Washington (state)
Defunct Premier Development League teams
1996 establishments in Washington (state)
National Premier Soccer League teams
Association football clubs established in 1996